Renata Alt (born 27 August 1965) is a German chemical engineer and politician of the Free Democratic Party (FDP) who has been serving as a member of the Bundestag from the state of Baden-Württemberg since 2017.

Early life and career
Renata (née Formánková) Alt was born in Skalica (western Slovakia). From 1993 until 1994, Alt worked as an economic attaché at the Consulate General of Slovakia in Munich. Since 1994, she has been operating her own consulting firm.

Political career
Alt became a member of the German Bundestag in the 2017 federal elections, representing the German state of Baden-Württemberg. She has since been serving on the Committee on Foreign Affairs – where she is her parliamentary group's rapporteur on relations with Russia, Central and Eastern Europe, and the Balkans – and on its Sub-Committee for Civilian Crisis Prevention.

Since 2021, Alt has been serving as chairwoman of the Committee on Human Rights and Humanitarian Aid.

In addition to her committee assignments, Alt has been serving as chairwoman of the German Parliamentary Friendship Group for relations with the Czech Republic, Slovakia and Hungary, and as deputy chairwoman of the Parliamentary Friendship Group for Relations with the States of South-Eastern Europe (Albania, Kosovo, North Macedonia, Montenegro and Serbia) since 2018. Since 2022, she has also been part of the German delegation to the Parliamentary Assembly of the Organization for Security and Co-operation in Europe.

Other activities
 Foundation "Remembrance, Responsibility and Future", Member of the Board of Trustees (since 2020)
 Center for International Peace Operations (ZIF), Member of the Supervisory Board (since 2018)

Personal life
Alt is married to hair stylist Thomas Alt. The family lives in Kirchheim unter Teck.

References 

Members of the Bundestag for Baden-Württemberg
Living people
1965 births
Members of the Bundestag 2017–2021
Members of the Bundestag 2021–2025
Female members of the Bundestag
Members of the Bundestag for the Free Democratic Party (Germany)
Slovak emigrants to Germany
People from Skalica
21st-century German women politicians